Malibran's Song (Spanish: La canción de La Malibrán) is a 1951 Spanish historical musical film directed by Luis Escobar. It is based on the life of the nineteenth century singer Maria Malibran.

Plot 
When María marries she abandons her singing career. But when his husband is in financial difficulties she will sing again, soon becoming worldwide famous.

Cast
 María de los Ángeles Morales as María Felicia 
 Carlos Agostí 
 Fernando Aguirre 
 Mariano Alcón 
 Gabriel Algara 
 Rafael Alonso 
 Matilde Artero 
 Félix Briones 
 Julia Caba Alba 
 Rafael Calvo Revilla 
 Adela Carboné 
 Benito Cobeña 
 Damián de Fez
 Carlos Díaz de Mendoza 
 Chano Gonzalo 
 Luis Hurtado 
 Concha López Silva 
 Mercedes Manero 
 Arturo Marín 
 Pilar Muñoz 
 Enrique Raymat 
 Raquel Rodrigo 
 Diana Salcedo 
 José Villasante 
 Juan Vázquez

References

Bibliography 
 de España, Rafael. Directory of Spanish and Portuguese film-makers and films. Greenwood Press, 1994.

External links 
 

1950s historical musical films
Spanish historical musical films
1951 films
1950s Spanish-language films
Films directed by Luis Escobar Kirkpatrick
Films set in the 19th century
Films scored by Jesús García Leoz
Spanish black-and-white films
1950s Spanish films